Kerselare (also Kerzelare) is a hamlet and pilgrimage site in Edelare, a village belonging to the municipality of Oudenaarde in the province of East Flanders, Belgium. Kerselare is located on the Edelareberg, the highest point of Edelare

Kerselare is host to a pilgrimage chapel, which origins goes back to the 15th century. A Mary statue had been placed underneath a cherry tree (Kerselaar in Dutch), and several miracles had occurred. Later inns were later built to the north and east of the site.

A new chapel in Gothic Revival style was constructed in 1614. This chapel underwent renovation in 1887, but was destroyed by a fire in 1961. A new, post-modernic chapel building arose in 1966.

References

External links 
 

Catholic pilgrimage sites
Oudenaarde
Populated places in East Flanders